Coast Guard Base Kodiak is a major shore installation of the United States Coast Guard, located in Kodiak, Alaska. The largest tenant unit on the base is Air Station Kodiak. It is also the home port for several cutters.  Historic elements that it includes are the Kodiak Naval Operating Base, Fort Greely, and Fort Abercrombie.

The station is the subject of the series Coast Guard Alaska on The Weather Channel and is prominently featured in the 2006 film The Guardian and is frequently referenced in the Discovery Channel series Deadliest Catch.

History
The base began as the United States Navy's Naval Air Station Kodiak on 15 June 1941. Artillery emplacements survive on Buskin Hill, Artillery Hill, and at Fort Abercrombie (now a state park), but little remains of Fort Greely's barracks.

On 17 April 1947 the Coast Guard Air Station was commissioned as an Air Detachment at the navy base with one PBY Catalina aircraft, seven pilots, and thirty crewmen.  On 25 April 1972 the order establishing Coast Guard Base Kodiak and CG RADSTA Kodiak was issued by the Commandant of the CG. CG Air Station Kodiak was already operating with three HC-130H airplanes and two HH-52A helicopters. Today, CG Air Station Kodiak operates five HC-130J aircraft, five MH-60T Jayhawk helicopters, and five MH-65C Dolphin helicopters.

Kodiak Naval Operating Base, Fort Greely, and Fort Abercrombie were together listed on the National Register of Historic Places and also declared to be a National Historic Landmark in 1985 for the role the facilities played in World War II.

2012 shooting
On April 12, 2012, two Coast Guard members were found fatally shot at their work stations in one of the communications buildings on-base. After an investigation conducted by the FBI, Coast Guard Investigative Service, and Alaska State Troopers, the prime suspect (James Michael "Jim" Wells) was arrested.

Homeported cutters 
USCGC Douglas Munro (WHEC-724)
USCGC Alex Haley (WMEC-39)
USCGC Spar (WLB-206)

See also
Fort Abercrombie State Historical Park
Naval Special Warfare Cold Weather Detachment Kodiak
List of National Historic Landmarks in Alaska
National Register of Historic Places listings in Kodiak Island Borough, Alaska

Notes

References

External links 

 Coast Guard Base Kodiak
 Coast Guard Air Station Kodiak
 17th District Alaska - USCG
 Base Kodiak MWR Nemetz RV Park

Kodiak
Buildings and structures in Kodiak Island Borough, Alaska
Kodiak
United States Coast Guard Aviation
Military installations in Alaska
World War II on the National Register of Historic Places in Alaska
1941 establishments in Alaska
Military installations established in 1941
United States Naval Air Stations